Intel's Communication Streaming Architecture (CSA) was a mechanism used in the Intel Hub Architecture to increase the bandwidth available between a network card and the CPU. It consists of connecting directly the network controller to the Memory Controller Hub (northbridge), instead of to the I/O Controller Hub (southbridge) through the PCI bus, which was the common practice until that point.

The technology was only used in Intel chipsets released in 2003, and was largely seen as a stop-gap measure to allow Gigabit Ethernet chips to run at full-speed until the arrival of a faster expansion bus (it was also used to connect the Wireless networking chips in Intel's Centrino mobile platform). To Intel's credit though, CSA-connected Ethernet chips did show consistently higher transfer rates than comparable PCI cards. 

The following year, PCI Express replaced CSA as the method of connecting network chips in Intel's chipsets, and the technology was subsequently discontinued.

External links
 Intel's page on CSA

Intel products